Chill Out is a 1995 album by John Lee Hooker featuring Van Morrison, Carlos Santana, Charles Brown, and Booker T. Jones. It was produced by Roy Rogers, Santana and Hooker himself, and executive produced by Mike Kappus. Tracks 1 to 11 were recorded and mixed at Russian Hill Recording, San Francisco and The Plant, Sausalito, California. The album reached No.3 in the US Blues chart and was awarded a W. C. Handy Award for  Traditional Blues Album of the Year.

Track listing
All songs written by John Lee Hooker except where noted:
"Chill Out (Things Gonna Change)" (John Lee Hooker, Carlos Santana, Chester Thompson)
"Deep Blue Sea"
"Kiddio" (Brook Benton, Clyde Otis)
"Medley: "Serves Me Right to Suffer" / "Syndicator"
"One Bourbon, One Scotch, One Beer"
"Tupelo"
"Woman On My Mind"
"Annie Mae"
"Too Young"
"Talkin' the Blues"
"If You've Never Been in Love"
"We'll Meet Again" (Deacon Jones, G. K. Fowler)

Personnel
John Lee Hooker - Guitar, vocals
Van Morrison - Guitar, vocals
Carlos Santana - Guitar
Danny Caron - Guitar
Roy Rogers - Guitar
Bruce Kaphan - Guitar
Billy Johnson - Guitar
Rich Kirch - Guitar
Chester Thompson - keyboards
Benny Rietveld - bass
Ruth Davies - bass
Mac Cridlin - Bass
Jim Guyett - Bass
Raoul Rekow - Congas
Karl Perazzo - Timbales
Gaylord Birch - Drums
Bowen Brown - Drums
Scott Mathews - Drums
Charles Brown - Piano
John Sanders - Piano
Booker T. Jones - Organ
Melvyn "Deacon" Jones - Organ

Chart

References

John Lee Hooker albums
1995 albums
Virgin Records albums
Albums produced by Roy Rogers (guitarist)